Rewrite is a visual novel developed by Key and published by VisualArt's in 2011. A fan disc for Rewrite titled Rewrite Harvest festa! was released in 2012. The discography of Rewrite and Harvest festa! consists of one studio album, seven singles, three soundtracks and seven remix albums. The core of the discography consists of two original soundtrack albums for the visual novels, one for Rewrite and the other for Harvest festa!. The soundtracks were produced by Key Sounds Label and released in 2011 and 2012. The music on the soundtracks was composed and arranged by Jun Maeda, Shinji Orito, Maiko Iuchi, Sōshi Hosoi, and Ryō Mizutsuki. An image song album was released in 2016. Seven singles were released between 2011 and 2017: two theme song singles for the visual novel, and five singles for the anime adaptation. A third soundtrack for the anime adaptation was released in 2017. The remix albums contains tracks from the games remixed by various artists and were released between 2011 and 2021.

Albums

Soil
Soil is a remix album which contains a selection of songs from the visual novel Rewrite, remixed by various artists. The album is otherwise composed, and produced by Shinji Orito, Maiko Iuchi, Sōshi Hosoi, and Ryō Mizutsuki. This album was released as a bonus item, included with the limited edition first printing of the PC version of Rewrite released on June 24, 2011 by Key Sounds Label bearing the catalog number KSLA-0070. As a result, it was not released for individual sale. The album contains one disc with ten remixed background music tracks from the visual novel. Annabel provides vocals for the song "Reply".

Rewrite Original Soundtrack
The Rewrite Original Soundtrack, from the visual novel Rewrite, was first released on August 12, 2011 at Comiket 80 in Japan by Key Sounds Label bearing the catalog numbers KSLA-0073–0075. It was later released for general sale on October 28, 2011. The soundtrack contains three discs totaling 63 songs composed, arranged, and produced by Jun Maeda, Shinji Orito, Maiko Iuchi, Sōshi Hosoi, Ryō Mizutsuki, Anant-Garde Eyes, MintJam, Donmaru, Manyo, and Manack. Four artists provide vocals for seven songs: Runa Mizutani sings "Philosophyz" and "Yami no Kanata e", Aoi Tada sings "Watari no Uta" and "Canoe", Nagi Yanagi sings "Koibumi" and "Itsuwaranai Kimi e", and Psychic Lover performs "Rewrite".

Branch
Branch is a remix album which contains a selection of songs from the visual novel Rewrite, remixed by various artists. The album is otherwise composed, and produced by Jun Maeda, Shinji Orito, Maiko Iuchi, Sōshi Hosoi, and Ryō Mizutsuki. The album was released on December 29, 2011 at Comiket 81 by Key Sounds Label bearing the catalog number KSLA-0076. The album contains eight remixed background music tracks from the visual novel. Three artists provide vocals for five songs: Annabel provides the chorus for "Orbita", Mao sings "Fertilizer" and "Kajitsu Renka", and Nagi Yanagi sings "Little Forest" and "Reply".

Feast
Feast is the original soundtrack from the visual novel Rewrite Harvest festa!. It was first released with the original release of the game on July 27, 2012 in Japan, and is produced by Key Sounds Label bearing the catalog number KSLA-0081. The soundtrack contains one disc with 14 music tracks composed, arranged, and produced by Shinji Orito, Maiko Iuchi, Sōshi Hosoi, Ryō Mizutsuki, Yūichirō Tsukagoshi of NanosizeMir, and Manabu Miwa. Aoi Tada sings the full and game size versions of "Harvest", and Runa Mizutani of NanosizeMir sings the full and game size versions of "Sasayaka na Hajimari".

Dye Mixture
Dye Mixture is a remix album with songs taken from the Rewrite and Rewrite Harvest festa! visual novels and arranged into rock versions. It was released on December 29, 2012 at Comiket 83 in Japan by Key Sounds Label bearing the catalog number KSLA-0091. The album contains one disc with ten tracks all arranged by the rock group MintJam. Three artists provide vocals for three songs: Aoi Tada sings "Harvest", Nagi Yanagi sings "Koibumi", and Runa Mizutani sings "Sasayaka na Hajimari". The album is otherwise composed and produced by Shinji Orito, Sōshi Hosoi, Maiko Iuchi, and NanosizeMir.

Crann Mor
Crann Mor (Irish for Great Tree) is a remix album with songs taken from the Rewrite visual novel. It was released on December 29, 2015 at Comiket 89 bearing the catalog number KSLA-0112. The album contains one disc with 12 tracks remixed by Hideki Higuchi. Aoi Tada provide vocals for two songs: "Kono Ki no Shita de" and "Sleeping Forest". The album is otherwise composed and produced by Jun Maeda, Shinji Orito, Maiko Iuchi, Sōshi Hosoi and Ryō Mizutsuki.

Selene
Selene is a remix album with songs taken from the Rewrite and Rewrite Harvest festa! visual novels remixed into rock and electronic dance music. It was bundled with Rewrite+ released on July 29, 2016 bearing the catalog number KSLA-0116. The album contains one disc with 11 tracks remixed by a variety of artists. The album is otherwise composed and produced by Shinji Orito, Sōshi Hosoi and Maiko Iuchi. "Philosophyz (Mizonokuchi Yūma remix)" is performed by Runa Mizutani, and "Sunbright (ALR Remix)" is performed by Ayaka Kitazawa.

Pureness Rhapsody
 is an image song album for the Rewrite visual novel, and was first released on December 29, 2016 at Comiket 91 in Japan by Key Sounds Label bearing the catalog number KSLA-0128. The album is for the heroines Chihaya Ohtori and Lucia Konohana, and contains one disc with 14 tracks sung by Saya Shinomiya and Risa Asaki, the voice actresses who voiced Chihaya and Lucia, respectively. The album is composed, arranged, and produced by Shinji Orito, Tomohiro Takeshita, Maiko Iuchi and Shoyu.

Rewrite Original Soundtrack
Rewrite Original Soundtrack is a soundtrack containing music tracks featured in the Rewrite anime series by 8-Bit. It was released on June 28, 2017 in Japan by Key Sounds Label bearing the catalog numbers KSLA-0136–0139. The soundtrack contains four discs totaling 89 tracks, although only 14 are original to this soundtrack. The tracks were composed, arranged, and produced by Jun Maeda, Shinji Orito, Maiko Iuchi, Sōshi Hosoi, Ryō Mizutsuki, Anant-Garde Eyes, MintJam, Donmaru, Manyo, and Manack.

Re:Change
Re:Change is a remix album of songs taken from the Rewrite and Rewrite Harvest festa! visual novels, as well as the Rewrite anime series, and remixed into electronic dance music. It was released on August 9, 2017 for the VisualArt's summer 2017 event at the Gamers store in Akihabara, Japan by Key Sounds Label bearing the catalog number KSLA-0140. The album contains one disc with ten tracks originally composed by Jun Maeda, Shinji Orito, Maiko Iuchi, Yuichiro Tsukagoshi, Donmaru, Tomohiro Takeshita and Yoffy, and features 12 remix artists. Performers featured on the album include Anri Kumaki, Maon Kurosaki, Runa Mizutani, Psychic Lover and Aoi Tada.

Forestia
Forestia is a remix album which contains a selection of songs from the visual novels Rewrite and Rewrite Harvest festa!. It was released on December 18, 2021 at Visual Arts Winter Fes in Japan by Key Sounds Label bearing the catalog number KSLA-0188. The album contains one disc with nine tracks originally composed by Jun Maeda, Shinji Orito, Maiko Iuchi, Sōshi Hosoi, Ryō Mizutsuki, Yūichirō Tsukagoshi and Tomohiro Takeshita, and features eight separate remix artists. Runa Mizutani sings "Philosophyz -■(memorial)-", "Sasayaka na Hajimari", and "White stars"; and Aoi Tada sings "Word of Dawn" and "Harvest".

Singles

Philosophyz
"Philosophyz" is a single from the visual novel Rewrite containing the game's first opening theme and one of the ending themes, both sung by Runa Mizutani of the dōjin music group NanosizeMir. The single was first released on January 28, 2011 in Japan by Key Sounds Label bearing the catalog number KSLA-0067. The single contains six tracks including original, short, and instrumental versions of "Philosophyz" and "Yami no Kanata e". The single is composed, arranged, and produced by Shinji Orito, Yūto Tonokawa, MintJam and Yūichirō Tsukagoshi of NanosizeMir.

Rewrite
"Rewrite" is a single by Psychic Lover released on May 27, 2011 in Japan by Key Sounds Label bearing the catalog number KSLA-0069. "Rewrite" was used as  the second opening theme song to the visual novel Rewrite. The single contains four tracks including original, short, off vocal and instrumental versions of "Rewrite".

Philosophyz / Sasayaka na Hajimari
"Philosophyz /  is a single for the Rewrite anime series by 8-Bit, which was released on July 27, 2016 in Japan by Key Sounds Label bearing the catalog number KSLA-0118. The single contains the opening and ending themes from the anime version in full length, TV length, and instrumental versions. The opening theme is "Philosophyz" and the ending theme is "Sasayaka na Hajimari", both sung by Runa Mizutani of NanosizeMir. Both songs are remixes of the theme songs featured in the Rewrite and Rewrite Harvest festa! visual novels. The single is composed and produced by Shinji Orito and Yūichirō Tsukagoshi.

End of the World / Hetakuso na Uta
"End of the World /  is a single by Anri Kumaki for the Rewrite anime series by 8-Bit, which was released on September 21, 2016 in Japan by Key Sounds Label bearing the catalog number KSLA-0120.

Word of Dawn / Okiraku Kyūsai
"Word of Dawn /  is a single by Aoi Tada for the Rewrite anime series by 8-Bit, which was released on September 21, 2016 in Japan by Key Sounds Label bearing the catalog number KSLA-0121.

Last Desire
"Last Desire" is a single by Maon Kurosaki for the Rewrite anime series by 8-Bit, which was released on March 22, 2017 in Japan by Key Sounds Label bearing the catalog number KSLA-0129.

Instincts
"Instincts" is a single by Runa Mizutani or the Rewrite anime series by 8-Bit, which was released on March 22, 2017 in Japan by Key Sounds Label bearing the catalog number KSLA-0130.

Chart positions

References

Discographies of Japanese artists
Key Sounds Label
Video game music discographies